4Kids Entertainment, Inc. (formerly known as Leisure Concepts, Inc. and later known as 4Licensing Corporation) was an American licensing company. The company was previously also a film and television production company that produced English-dubbed Japanese anime through its subsidiary 4Kids Productions between 1992 and 2012; it specialized in the acquisition, production and licensing of children's entertainment around the United States. The first anime that 4Kids Productions dubbed was the first eight seasons of Pokémon that originally began airing on first run syndication and then it later moved to exclusively air on Kids' WB! in the United States. The company is most well known for its range of television licenses, which has included the multibillion-dollar Pokémon and Yu-Gi-Oh! Japanese anime franchises. They also ran two program blocks: Toonzai (originally The CW4Kids) on The CW, and 4Kids TV (originally FoxBox) on Fox, both aimed at children. The 4KidsTV block ended on December 27, 2008; Toonzai block ended on August 18, 2012, which was replaced by Saban's Vortexx, which in itself was succeeded by Litton's One Magnificent Morning in 2014.

4Licensing Corporation had its world headquarters on Third Avenue in New York City, its former subsidiary, 4Kids Productions, had its headquarters in a separate building in Manhattan. The New York Stock Exchange delisted 4Kids (NYSE: KDE) on June 1, 2010. On April 6, 2011, it filed for Chapter 11 bankruptcy protection following a lawsuit concerning the Yu-Gi-Oh! franchise. On December 13, 2012, the company announced that it had emerged from bankruptcy. On September 21, 2016, it filed for Chapter 11 bankruptcy protection once again and shut down operations one year later. 4Kids' former CEO, Alfred R. Kahn, founded a successor company called Kidtagious Entertainment in 2019.

History

Company origins 
Leisure Concepts was co-founded on April 28, 1970, by Mike Germakian (later who would be known as one of the creators of ThunderCats) and Stan Weston (the creator of G.I. Joe and Captain Action), as an independent licensing agency in New York City. Mike Germakian was the secretary of LCI, while Stan Weston was initially the President and later the Chairman of Leisure Concepts. Weston was also the Treasurer of the company.

1970–1990: Early beginnings 

In the beginning, the company pitched toy and cartoon ideas to various companies, as well as formed partnerships with companies such as Rankin/Bass, among others.

LCI began making news in the 1980s through licensing actual people, a variety of products, and even concepts. The company also had a growing number of deals with television producers and toy manufacturers.
Among the company's licenses at the time were Farrah Fawcett of Charlie's Angels fame, Charlie Chan, James Bond 007, a wide array of Nintendo characters and products, the Hulk, Buck Rogers in the 25th Century TV Series and many others.

LCI is credited in its assistance in the initial development of the "ThunderCats" concept and acted on behalf of Lorimar-Telepictures Corp as an exclusive worldwide licensing agent for products based on "Thundercats", an agreement that was signed between the two parties on June 15, 1984.

During the mid-1980s, Ted Wolf came up with the idea of a race of catlike humanoid superheroes. He shared his vision with his friend Stan Weston, who in turn, through LCI, pitched it to Rankin/Bass Animated Entertainment. Both Arthur Rankin Jr and Jules Bass were impressed with the idea and the potential that it had of becoming an instant success. They approved of it and "ThunderCats" went into production.

During the early development stage, Mike Germakian designed much of the ThunderCats' characters, vehicles and locations. He was also responsible for creating the now iconic ThunderCats logo, featuring a stylized black panther head on a red circle. Germakian's designs were then sent to Pacific Animation Corporation in Japan to be adapted into cartoon format. After completing work on ThunderCats, Germakian went on to design characters for SilverHawks and The Comic Strip, both Rankin/Bass shows.

In July 1987, Alfred Kahn, former Executive Vice President of Marketing at Coleco, who was credited for bringing the Cabbage Patch Kids to the Mainstream, joined the company as vice chairman and a member of the board of directors.

On December 17, 1987, LCI signed a licensing deal with Nintendo of America, Inc. to market the software products that went along with its increasingly popular gaming systems. Nintendo had already introduced The Legend of Zelda for its home video game system, a software product that went on to sell more than one million copies during the year. Some time in 1986, the company also signed a licensing deal to market Star Wars.

1990–2000: Expansion and name change 

The 1990s were seen as turning point for the company. In the early 1990s, LCI expanded its operations and began television production in 1992. This would include English-dubbing Japanese anime through its subsidiary 4Kids Productions, which the company would be mostly known for.

In 1987, Bobby Kotick (now President and CEO of Activision Blizzard) tried to acquire Commodore International. When Kotick was unsuccessful he instead purchased a controlling stake in LCI, thus also becoming LCI's CEO and chairman in June 1990. Kotick later traded out of his stake in LCI and bought a 25% stake in Activision in December 1990. In March 1991, Kotick became CEO at Activision.

The company did $6 million in sales in 1989 and employed 14 people by 1990.

On March 12, 1991, LCI appointed Alfred Kahn as its chairman and CEO.

In 1992, two subsidiaries were established by the company: The Summit Media Group, Inc. and 4Kids Productions.

The company changed its name from Leisure Concepts Inc. to 4Kids Entertainment Inc. on November 16, 1995. Although the company changed its name, "Leisure Concepts" still operated as a separate subsidiary of the company, meaning the company may have decided to use the "Leisure Concepts" name for branding purposes.

By 1999, 4Kids Entertainment employed 50 people.

2000–2005: The new millennium 

The new century found 4Kids Entertainment Inc., switching from the NASDAQ market and joining the New York Stock Exchange on September 20, 2000.
The firm's new ticker symbol was KDE and the company was riding high during the continuing success of "Pokemon" when it earned Fortune's top slot on its 100 Fastest Growing Companies for 2000. The company was also listed on the Frankfurt Exchange earlier in the year.

On April 5, 2000, 4Kids and Mattel signed a licensing agreement to create Hot Wheels die-cast cars and racing sets featuring the PACE Motor Sports line of monster trucks. The license included rights to the monster truck Grave Digger, and a new line of World Championship Wrestling vehicles designed after their star wrestlers such as Goldberg, Sting and Bret Hart. The PACE Motor Sports and World Championship Wrestling line of Hot Wheels vehicles have been available nationally at mass-market retailers beginning in the summer of that year.

In 2001, 4Kids Entertainment obtained the merchandising and television rights to the series Yu-Gi-Oh! Duel Monsters from Nihon Ad Systems, producing an English-language version which aired in North America on Kids' WB from September 29, 2001, to June 10, 2006.

In October 2001, 4Kids Entertainment acquired a 3% stake in The Pokémon Company, in a move to benefit indirectly from Pokémon's success in Asia, and from worldwide sales of Pokémon electronic cards and video games.

In late January 2002, after engaging in a bidding war with DIC Entertainment, 4Kids Entertainment signed a four-year, US$100 million deal with the Fox Broadcasting Company to program its Saturday morning lineup. 4Kids Entertainment was wholly responsible for the content of the block and collected all advertising revenues from it.

In May 2002, 4Kids Entertainment launched a home video division called 4Kids Entertainment Home Video, and appointed FUNimation Productions as the exclusive distributor for their Yu-Gi-Oh!, Cubix, Cabbage Patch Kids and Tama and Friends properties.

By 2002, 4Kids got $140 million in Pokémon revenue.

4Kids' new Saturday-Morning cartoon block on fox premiered on September 14, 2002, as "FoxBox" FoxBox rebranded to "4Kids TV" in January 2005.

2005–2010: Further expansion and financial failings 
On October 10, 2005, 4Kids Entertainment sold its 3% stake in The Pokémon Company for US$960,000, to the three parties owning the rights to Pokémon (Nintendo, Creatures and Game Freak).

On December 23, 2005, the company announced that it will not renew the Pokémon representation agreement set to expire on December 31, 2005. And that beginning in 2006, Pokémon USA, Inc.'s in-house licensing group will handle all Pokémon licensing outside of Asia. However the company will continue to receive commissions for the next several years, on payments made under existing Pokémon license agreements whose term expires after December 31, 2005.

On January 17, 2006, 4Kids and Microsoft signed a deal to license children's video games exclusively for the Xbox 360 gaming system, in an effort to put more child-oriented games on the system, whose gaming library was at the time dominated by games targeted toward the 12-and-up market. One of the first titles announced was Viva Piñata which would be developed by Rare. On June 10, 2006, 4Kids licensed the sequel series to Yu-Gi-Oh, Yu-Gi-Oh GX, for release in North America.

On April 18, 2006, 4Kids launched a new subsidiary entitled 4Sight Licensing Solutions Inc., which licenses and market brands aimed at adults, teenagers and pre-teens. "We have built an impressive roster of captivating and successful children's entertainment properties," said Alfred Kahn. "Given the increased number of brands that we are representing that focus on an older audience, we felt it would be beneficial to organize a new subsidiary primarily devoted to the marketing and licensing of these brands. We believe that we can successfully utilize our marketing and licensing expertise to build brand value for properties targeting an older consumer that are not necessarily media or character driven."

On December 11, 2006, 4Kids Entertainment announced the formation of two subsidiaries, TC Digital Games, LLC, a trading card company, and TC Websites, LLC, an online multi-platform game company. "The formation of TC Digital Games and TC Websites represent a significant enhancement of our business strategy," said Alfred R. Kahn, chairman and CEO of 4Kids Entertainment. TC Digital Games LLC and TC Websites LLC were shut down in 2010, due to continued lack of profitability.

On October 2, 2007, Warner Bros. and CBS announced that the Kids' WB programming block on their co-owned network, The CW, would be ending in 2008, and no longer be marketed and produced in-house, due to factors including cable competition. Rights for the five-hour Saturday morning block were bought by 4Kids, and they began to program the time with their own programming (mixed in with three former Kids' WB originals) in September 2008. Because of this additional deal, 4Kids provided programming for both The CW and Fox in the 2008–09 season giving 4Kids nine hours of combined children's programming on two broadcast networks, as 4KidsTV ran until December 27, 2008. The new block, The CW4Kids, started May 24, 2008. The CW4Kids was renamed to Toonzai starting on August 14, 2010, featuring Magical Do-Re-Mi!, Cubix: Robots for Everyone, Dinosaur King, Yu-Gi-Oh!, Yu-Gi-Oh! 5D's, Sonic X and Dragon Ball Z Kai. Even though 4Kids TV was discontinued as it was online only, this programming block continued to use the CW4Kids name, to reflect to the network it airs on. 4Kids also indicated that it retained Yu-Gi-Oh! and Sonic X in its lineup. In addition to that, Toonzai also aired Dragon Ball Z Kai. The Toonzai block ended on August 18, 2012. A week later, the block was replaced by Vortexx, which ran as a final Saturday morning cartoon block on The CW from August 25, 2012, to September 27, 2014, before being replaced by One Magnificent Morning on October 4, 2014.

On November 10, 2008, 4Kids Entertainment announced that it would exit its contract with Fox and terminate its Fox programming block by the end of 2008. The final broadcast of 4Kids TV on Fox was on December 27, 2008.

On December 17, 2008, 4Kids Entertainment announced that it is laying off about 15% of its workforce due to the worsening economic environment, and financial situation at the company.

2010–2012: Decline and first bankruptcy 
On May 28, 2010, the company announced that New York Stock Exchange (NYSE) trading in its common stock would be suspended prior to the opening of trading on Tuesday, June 1, 2010, thus effectively delisting the company from the New York Stock Exchange. Beginning June 1, 2010, the company began trading under the new stock symbol "KIDE" on the OTC Bulletin Board (OTCBB) market.

On January 11, 2011, the company announced that Alfred Kahn, the CEO and Chairman of the Company since March 1991, had left the company. Michael Goldstein, a member of the company's Board of Directors since March 2003, was appointed interim chairman, while the company was conducting a search for a new CEO.

On March 29, 2011, TV Tokyo and Nihon Ad Systems (NAS) sued 4Kids Entertainment, alleging that the company entered into illegal agreements with other companies, including Funimation Entertainment and Majesco Entertainment, regarding the Yu-Gi-Oh! anime franchise. TV Tokyo claimed that those agreements allowed 4Kids to collect royalties without paying a portion of those royalties to TV Tokyo, which violates their original agreement. The companies are seeking almost $5 million in "underpayments, wrongful deductions, and unmet obligations." As part of the suit, the companies terminated the Yu-Gi-Oh! license from 4Kids. Neither Funimation nor Majesco are listed as defendants in the case.

4Kids Entertainment informed the licensors on March 27, 2011, that their termination letter was "wrongful and devoid of any factual and legal basis," and that they had not given 4Kids 10 days notice as required. 4Kids further revealed that they had made a good-faith payment of $1 million and agreed to a March 18 meeting in lieu of a lawsuit, which TV Tokyo and NAS nevertheless decided to go ahead with. The company also stated that even if the termination is found to be valid, the company is prepared to do whatever it takes to stay in business. 4Kids filed for Chapter 11 bankruptcy protection as of April 6, 2011. 4Kids requested that the court suspend co-licensor Asatsu DK's attempts to exercise control of the Yu-Gi-Oh! franchise in the United States, particularly in terms of selling the rights to the latest anime series, Yu-Gi-Oh! Zexal, which was due to be pitched at the Licensing International Expo on June 14. However, on June 2, 2011, bankruptcy judge Shelley Chapman issued a court order on TV Tokyo and NAS for an automatic stay on the U.S. Yu-Gi-Oh! license and said that the trial will proceed in two phases. The first phase is whether the contractual termination was valid, and the second is how much money 4Kids would owe the companies. The first phase of the trial began on August 29, 2011.

On October 27, 2011, 4Kids and the executives of former financial company Lehman Brothers reached a deal, after Lehman had improperly invested most of 4Kids funds in auction rate securities. 4Kids received $500,000 from the deal. Chapman later ruled that the Yu-Gi-Oh! license is still in effect due to TV Tokyo, NAS and ADK not terminating the agreement properly. On February 29, 2012, there was an amicable settlement of the lawsuit between 4Kids Entertainment and Asatsu-DK (ADK) and TV Tokyo over the license of the Yu-Gi-Oh! property.

On May 1, 2012, Kidsco Media Ventures LLC, an affiliate of Saban Capital Group, placed a bid to acquire some of 4Kids' assets, including the US rights to the Yu-Gi-Oh! franchise and The CW4Kids block, for $10 million. On June 5, 2012, 4Kids commenced an auction between Kidsco and 4K Acquisition which was then adjourned so 4Kids, Kidsco, and 4K Acquisition could consider an alternative transaction. On June 15, 2012, 4Kids filed a notice outlining a proposed deal in which its assets would be divided between Kidsco and 4K Acquisition which was finalised on June 26, 2012. The deal saw 4K Acquisition acquire the US rights to the Yu-Gi-Oh! franchise and KidsCo acquire 4Kids' other assets including the agreements for Dragon Ball Z, Sonic X, Cubix and The CW Network's Toonzai Saturday morning programming block.

On August 14, 2012, it was announced through a quarterly report that 4Kids Entertainment had discontinued operations of four operating divisions: 4Kids Ad Sales Inc., 4Kids Productions Inc., 4Kids Entertainment Music Inc., and 4Kids Entertainment Home Video, Inc. due to their continued lack of profitability. On September 13, 2012, it was revealed through a quarterly report that on August 16, 2012, the Board of Directors of 4Kids Entertainment determined to discontinue the operations of its UK subsidiary, 4Kids Entertainment International Ltd., which became effective on September 30, 2012. On December 5, 2012, 4Kids Entertainment announced that it had ended a dispute (over the so-called Pokémon agreement) with The Pokémon Company International under which TPCi will get a $1 million general unsecured claim against the debtor.

2012–2016: Rebrand as 4Licensing Corporation 

A meeting was scheduled on December 13, 2012, to confirm 4Kids' plan to exit bankruptcy. The same day, the New York bankruptcy judge sent 4Kids Entertainment Inc. on its way out of Chapter 11 protection Thursday, overruling an objection by the American Kennel Club Inc. over a licensing agreement and approving its reorganization plan, which calls for the full payment of claims.

On December 21, 2012, 4Kids Entertainment was renamed 4Licensing Corporation.

2016–2017: Second bankruptcy and closure 
On September 21, 2016, 4Licensing Corporation filed for Chapter 11 bankruptcy; the bankruptcy plan became effective on February 7, 2017, and the company immediately ceased operations thereafter.

Licenses and productions 

4Kids Entertainment licensed a wide variety of media products, ranging from video games and television programs to toy lines featuring the Royal Air Force. 4Kids focused on licensing content for the children's market. including content for both boys and girls. Many of its licenses came from dubs of Japanese anime, including Fighting Foodons, and Shaman King, while others are Western animations or properties like Chaotic or Back to the Future: The Animated Series.

Most programs were either licensed out to local stations, or broadcast on their dedicated programming block 4Kids TV. Typically, 4Kids would retain several properties on hiatus (such as Yu-Gi-Oh! GX), or in production to allow for turnover of their existing products. 4Kids also licensed, and merchandised, a number of non-animation based products, such as calendars like The Dog, and toys like Cabbage Patch Kids.

Back catalogues 
 FilmRise
 Shout! Factory
 RLJE Films
 The Pokémon Company
 Konami (Konami Cross Media NY)
 Discotek Media
 Hasbro (Entertainment One)
 Viz Media
 Media Blasters
 Crunchyroll (formerly Funimation)

Executive management 
This is a list of Chief Executive Officers that ran 4Kids Entertainment.

Chief executive officers 
 June 1990–December 1990: Robert Kotick
 March 12, 1991 – January 11, 2011: Alfred R. Kahn
 January 11, 2011 – September 30, 2012: Michael Goldstein
 October 16, 2012 – February 29, 2016: Bruce R. Foster

Criticism and controversy 

During its operation as 4Kids Entertainment, the company faced intense criticism from viewers over the company's extensive editing and localization of the anime and other non-American series they licensed. Practices like censorship, story editing, music editing, and their "Americanization" of Japanese culture references, which were changed to be more American. One example included characters eating rice balls commenting that they were eating jelly donuts in their dub of the original Pokémon anime.

At the 2019 Fan Expo Canada, Eric Stuart, who did the voice of Brock in the 4Kids dub of Pokémon, and the voice of Seto Kaiba in the English dub of Yu-Gi-Oh!, and who was also part of the production side, mentioned why 4Kids' dubs had this censorship. He explained that American culture has different sensitivity to certain content compared to Japanese culture, and networks on Saturday mornings had standards that would forbid certain inappropriate content like firearms, sexual references, religious references, display or mention of death, alcohol, cigarettes, and other content that is considered offensive to American audiences. As the censorship is dictated by the networks and not the production company itself, 4Kids would submit the scripts and footage of their dubs to the networks their dubs air on, and then the executives of those networks would review them. Then after they reviewed it, they would tell 4Kids to cut out certain scenes and edit inappropriate content to something particular like change Sanji's cigarette to a lollipop in One Piece, or change a stone that looks like a cross to something non-religious in order for their dubs to pass the network's standards. He also pointed out that Pokémon, and anime as a whole, wouldn't be as wildly popular as it is today if companies like 4Kids didn't air it on network television instead of being in the back of a video store.

At the 2016 Metrocon, Eric Stuart also explained the "Americanization" in 4Kids' dubs. He stated that those edits were actually international edits. When companies like 4Kids purchase the licensing to Japanese anime, the anime not only was redubbed into English but also redubbed into multiple languages because companies like 4Kids were used to distribute the anime to other countries by using their own dubs and licensing them to other countries to have their dubs be used to distribute the anime. The Japanese food products being changed and Japanese references being removed were requested by those Japanese anime companies because they wanted their anime to be distributed worldwide and wanted international audiences to relate to their products much easier. So while the Japanese anime companies remove the Japanese text on signs, 4Kids removed the scenes involving Japanese references and changed the names of the Japanese food products like rice balls to something more international like donuts while only occasionally changing the animation to the foods since making animation changes causes rise in production costs and they already have to make plenty of animation changes in their dubs.

A March 2006 study by the Parents Television Council, a conservative advocacy group, on violence in children's television programs claimed that the 4Kids dub of Shaman King was still too violent for children.

References 

  This article contains quotations from Leisure Concepts at the ThunderCats wiki, which is available under a Attribution-ShareAlike 3.0 Unported (CC BY-SA 3.0) license.
  This article contains quotations from Mike Germakian at the ThunderCats wiki, which is available under a Attribution-ShareAlike 3.0 Unported (CC BY-SA 3.0) license.

External links 

 4Licensing Corporation (archive)
 4kidsent.com (archive)
 

 
American animation studios
Anime companies
Anime and manga controversies
Animation controversies in television
Brokered programming
Children's television
Companies formerly listed on the New York Stock Exchange
American companies established in 1970
Mass media companies disestablished in 2017
Companies that filed for Chapter 11 bankruptcy in 2011
Dubbing (filmmaking)
Mass media companies based in New York City
Television censorship in the United States
Television production companies of the United States
Companies that filed for Chapter 11 bankruptcy in 2016
Mass media companies established in 1970
1970 establishments in New York City
2017 disestablishments in New York (state)